Qatar competed at the 2004 Summer Olympics in Athens, Greece, from 13 to 29 August 2004.

Athletics

Qatari athletes have so far achieved qualifying standards in the following athletics events (up to a maximum of 3 athletes in each event at the 'A' Standard, and 1 at the 'B' Standard).

Men
Track & road events

Field events

Combined events – Decathlon

Shooting

Two Qatari shooters qualified to compete in the following events:

Men

Swimming

Men

Weightlifting 

Two Qatari weightlifters (both were born in Bulgaria, but changed their nationality) qualified for the following events:

See also
 Qatar at the 2002 Asian Games
 Qatar at the 2004 Summer Paralympics

References

External links
Official Report of the XXVIII Olympiad
Qatar Olympic Committee 

Nations at the 2004 Summer Olympics
2004
Summer Olympics